Greenmeadows may refer to:

Places

New Zealand
Greenmeadows, New Zealand, suburb of Napier, New Zealand

United States
Green Meadows, Ohio
Green Meadows, Maryland

Miscellaneous
Green Meadows Conference (OHSAA), an OHSAA athletic league based in northwest Ohio.

See also
Green Meadow (disambiguation)